The men's 50 kilometre freestyle competition in cross-country skiing at the 2022 Winter Olympics was held on 19 February, at the Kuyangshu Nordic Center and Biathlon Center in Taizicheng. Alexander Bolshunov, representing the Russian Olympic Committee, won the event, and Ivan Yakimushkin, also of ROC, won silver, his first Olympic medal. Simen Hegstad Krüger of Norway won the bronze medal, competing in his first and only race at these Games after an illness. Bolshunov became only the second skier who won 30 km and 50 km at the same Olympics, after Russian Nikolay Zimyatov accomplished this in 1980.

This event was delayed by an hour and shortened to  due to high winds and freezing temperature. Athletes complained that the weather conditions were too severe, but many also criticized the decision to shorten the race. 28th place finisher, Finland’s Remi Lindholm, suffered a frozen penis as a result of the extreme conditions. The decision means that the gap between "proper" Olympic men's 50 km freestyle races will be at least sixteen years from Sochi 2014 to the 2030 Olympics. It also caused the rare occurrence that the women's 30-kilometre race, held the following day, was the longest cross-country skiing race in the Beijing Olympics both in course length and duration, despite women's distance races usually being significantly shorter than men's.

Summary
The  distance event alternates between classical style and free style skiing in succeeding Olympics, and in 2022 it was the free style event. The defending champion was Iivo Niskanen, who declined to compete due to favoring classical style. The silver medalist, Alexander Bolshunov, qualified for the Olympics but the bronze medalist, Andrey Larkov, did not. The overall leader of the 2021–22 FIS Cross-Country World Cup before the Olympics was Johannes Høsflot Klæbo, and the distance leader was Bolshunov. The season was dominated by the Norwegians and Russians, who together took 20 podium places in distance events out of 24, and three more podium places were taken by Niskanen. Emil Iversen was the 2021 World Champion in 50 km classical.

At , a group of 14 skiers were within 6 seconds of each other and had a gap of 6 seconds to the next pursuer and almost half a minute to the rest of the skiers in the race. This group included all four ROC skiers. At , only 10 skiers remained in the leading group. Even when they were entering the stadium, Bolshunov, Artem Maltsev, Yakimushkin, Sjur Røthe, and Krueger were skiing in a group. Bolshunov was the fastest at the finish line.

Qualification

Results
The race was scheduled for 14:00, but the start was delayed to 15:00 and the race distance shortened to 28.4 km due to inclement weather.

References

Men's cross-country skiing at the 2022 Winter Olympics